Maisi may refer to:

 Maisi fisheri, a species of beetle in the monotypic genus Maisi
 Maisí, a municipality and town in the Guantánamo Province of Cuba
 Maisi, real name Maisie Bourke, musician, Loud LDN co-founder and Jo Brand's daughter

See also
 Maisie (disambiguation)
 Maisy
 Mazie (disambiguation)